Calabria was a small protected cruiser built for the Italian Regia Marina (Royal Navy) in the 1890s, intended for service in Italy's overseas empire. She was laid down in 1892, launched in 1894, and completed in 1897, and was armed with a main battery of four  and four  guns. Calabria spent significant periods abroad, ranging from deployments to Chinese, North American, and Australian waters, in addition to periods in Italy's East African empire. She saw action during the Italo-Turkish War in 1912 in the Red Sea, primarily bombarding Turkish ports in the area. Calabria was reclassified as a gunboat in 1921, reduced to a training ship in 1924, and sold for scrap at the end of the year.

Design

Calabria was designed by the Chief Engineer, Edoardo Masdea, and was intended for overseas service in the Italian colonial empire. She had a steel hull sheathed with wood and zinc to protect it from fouling during lengthy deployments abroad, where shipyard facilities would not be readily available. She had a flush deck and a ram bow; her superstructure was fairly minimal, consisting primarily of a small conning tower forward. She was fitted with three pole masts for signaling and spotting purposes. Calabria had a crew of between 214 and 254 officers and enlisted crew.

The cruiser was powered by two vertical triple-expansion steam engines that each drove a screw propeller. Steam was supplied by four coal-fired, cylindrical fire-tube boilers that were vented into a single funnel placed amidships, directly astern of the conning tower.

Calabria was armed with a main battery of four  L/40 guns, supported by a secondary battery of four  L/40 guns, all mounted individually. Light armament for close-range defense against torpedo boats included eight  L/40 guns, eight  L/20 guns, and a pair of machine guns. She was also equipped with a pair of  torpedo tubes. Her conning tower also received 50 mm of steel plating on the sides.

Service history

Calabria was built at the La Spezia dockyard, with her keel being laid down in February 1892. She was launched on 20 September 1894, and fitting-out work was completed by mid-1897; the new cruiser was commissioned into the Regia Marina (Royal Navy) on 12 July.

Calabria spent long periods abroad in her first decade of service. She was operating in Chinese waters in 1899 when the Boxer Uprising broke out. She joined an international fleet that included representatives from the fleets of the Eight Nation Alliance in the mouth of the Hai River while a contingent of 475 soldiers traveled to Beijing to reinforce the Legation Quarter.

The ship was present on 20 May 1902 when the United States formally granted independence to the Republic of Cuba, following the Spanish–American War three years earlier. Calabria and the British protected cruiser  fired salutes to the United States armored cruiser . In April 1903, Calabria joined a naval review held for the Japanese Emperor Meiji in Kobe, Japan. The foreign naval contingent included the British pre-dreadnought battleship  and protected cruiser , the German protected cruiser , the French protected cruiser , and the Russian protected cruiser .

Calabria embarked on another major overseas cruise in early 1905 with the then-midshipman Prince Ferdinando aboard, departing Venice on 4 February. By this time, the ship had been fitted with wireless telegraphy equipment. She made a call in Gibraltar before sailing to the West Indies, where she stopped in Santo Domingo in the Dominican Republic. The visit represented an attempt at gunboat diplomacy, aimed at securing payments for debts to Italian nationals. From there, she continued on south to South America, stopping in many ports as she made her way around the continent, including Buenos Aires, Argentina; Rio de Janeiro, Brazil; Montevideo, Uruguay; Callao and Lima, Peru; Valparaiso, Chile; and Acapulco, Mexico. By 11 September, she had reached San Francisco in the United States. Later in the year, as she continued her circumnavigation of the globe, Calabria visited Australia on a trip to show the flag. By May 1906, Calabria was in Chinese waters, and on the 18th, she was present in Nanking in company with the French cruiser  and the German gunboat . In October 1909, Calabria took part in the Portola Festival in San Francisco, marking the 140th anniversary of the Portolà expedition, the first recorded European exploration of what became California.

Italo-Turkish War

On 29 September 1911, Italy declared war on the Ottoman Empire to seize Ottoman Tripolitania and incorporate it into its overseas empire. The Ottomans intended to distract Italian attention by threatening the colony of Italian Eritrea, across the Red Sea from Ottoman Arabia. For their part, the Italians decided to support anti-Ottoman rebels in Yemen to tie up Ottoman forces away from Tripolitania. At that time, Calabria was stationed in the Far East, but she was immediately recalled to reinforce the naval forces in Eritrea. After arriving in East African waters, she joined the cruiser  in bombarding the Turkish port of Aqaba on 19 November to disperse a contingent of Ottoman soldiers there. Hostilities were temporarily ceased while the British King George V passed through the Red Sea following his coronation ceremony in India—the ceasefire lasted until 26 November. Four days later, Calabria and the gunboat  attacked a quarantine station near Perim. She took part in further attacks at Mocha and Cheikh Saïd.

In early 1912, the Italian Red Sea Fleet searched for a group of seven Ottoman gunboats thought to be planning an attack on Eritrea, though they were in fact immobilized due to a lack of coal. Calabria and Puglia carried out diversionary bombardments against Jebl Tahr, and Al Luḩayyah, while the cruiser  and the destroyers  and  searched for the gunboats. On 7 January, they found the gunboats and quickly sank four in the Battle of Kunfuda Bay; the other three were forced to beach to avoid sinking as well. The next day, the Italian warships sent a shore party to destroy the grounded gunboats. With the Ottoman naval threat neutralized, the Italians turned their attention to supporting the anti-Ottoman insurgents in the region. Calabria and the rest of the Italian ships returned to bombarding the Turkish ports in the Red Sea before declaring a blockade of the city of Al Hudaydah on 26 January. Calabria returned to Italy by April for refitting. The Ottomans eventually agreed to surrender in October, ending the war.

Later career
In 1914, her armament was reduced; the 15 cm guns were removed and two additional 12 cm guns were installed in their place. Two of the 5.7 cm guns and six of the 3.7 cm guns were also removed. In January 1915, while Italy was still neutral during World War I, Calabria was sent to the coast of Ottoman Syria to assist with the protection of refugees in the area. During this period, she cooperated with the United States armored cruiser . The ship took a diplomatic mission from Massawa across the Red Sea to visit Hussein bin Ali, the recently proclaimed King of Hejaz, in Mecca in July 1917. Calabria returned to East African waters in January 1918 on another mission to show the flag, particularly off the coast of Somalia. Stops included Aden and Djibouti. Calabria was reclassified as a gunboat in 1921, and she saw her armament modified again; a 15 cm gun was reinstalled, as were two of the 5.7 cm guns. A  L/39 autocannon was also added at this time. She served in this role for only a short time, and was reduced to a training ship for naval gunners in early 1924. This duty ended quickly, and she was sold for scrap on 13 November 1924.

Footnotes

Notes

Citations

References

External links

 Calabria Marina Militare website 

World War I cruisers of Italy
1894 ships
Ships built in La Spezia